The Luton Peace Day Riots occurred over three days from 19 to 21 July 1919. Servicemen angry at the lavish spending for London's peace parade, held on the same day, following the end of the First World War, protested that the money should be spent on integrating soldiers returning from the war.

Riot

On Peace Day, 19 July 1919, the Luton Town Hall was burnt down during a riot by ex-servicemen unhappy with unemployment and other grievances. The riot started after members of the council arrived to read out the proclamation of peace, and many in the crowd expressed their disapproval. One issue was veterans not being allowed to hold a drumhead mass in Wardown Park. Tension boiled over into violence, and after a number of clashes, many protesters broke through the police line and forcibly entered the town hall, which was eventually set on fire.

Order was eventually restored to the town by midnight on 19 July, but the fire brigade were unable to extinguish the fire, and by the next morning the town hall was little more than a ruin. The remains of the building were demolished in August 1919 and in 1922 the statue "Peace", designed by Sir Reginald Blomfield, inscribed with the names of more than 280,000 dead servicemen from the Great War, was unveiled.

Aftermath

Many of those arrested received serious sentences. John Henry Good who took part in the riots was sentenced to six weeks of hard labour.

In 2019, to commemorate the centenary of the 1919 Peace Riots, Cultural Histories Community Interest Company, working with a number of partner organisations, individuals and local community groups in Luton, developed a range of projects to promote awareness and interest in the 1919 Peace Days riots via a programme of learning and the performing arts. The projects included collecting personal and family recollections of the Peace Riots, plus art and music projects to promote local awareness of the event.

Notes

References
 
 
 - Total pages: 191 
 
 

1919 crimes in the United Kingdom
Luton riot
Luton
20th century in Bedfordshire
Crime in Bedfordshire
July 1919 crimes
July 1919 events in Europe
Riots and civil disorder in England